Pseudopolinices is a genus of predatory sea snails, marine gastropod mollusks in the family Naticidae, the moon snails.

Species
Species within the genus Pseudopolinices include:

 Pseudopolinices nanus (Møller, 1842)

References

 Gofas, S.; Le Renard, J.; Bouchet, P. (2001). Mollusca. in: Costello, M.J. et al. (eds), European Register of Marine Species: a check-list of the marine species in Europe and a bibliography of guides to their identification. Patrimoines Naturels. 50: 180-213

External links

Naticidae
Monotypic gastropod genera